This page details statistics and records regarding the North Wales Crusaders Rugby League club. This includes competitive matches following their inception in 2012.

Team Records

Seasons
 

As of 02/09/12. Round is the round reached in the competition.

Wins & Losses

As of 2/9/12

Opposition

As of 02/9/12

Attendance

Highest Attendance: 1,513 V Barrow Raiders (11 March 2012) 

As of 12/8/12

Player Records 

For a list of North Wales Crusaders players,

Player summary

As of 2/9/12

Appearances

As of 10/4/18

Points

As of 10/4/18

Tries

As of 2/9/12

Goals

As of 2/9/12

Firsts

Games

First game: Friendly V Leigh East at Leigh Sports Village on 20/1/12. Won 12-34 
First competitive game: Championship 1 game V Barrow Raiders at Racecourse Ground on 11/3/12. Lost 24-26 
First Challenge Cup game: V Toulouse Olympique at Racecourse Ground on 24/3/12. Won 28-10 
First win: Challenge Cup game V Toulouse Olympique at Racecourse Ground on 34/3/12. Won 28-10

Players

First Try: Lee Hudson v Leigh East on 20/1/12.
First competitive Try: Andy Moulsdale v Barrow Raiders on 11/3/12.
Most Try's in a Game: 3 Leon Brennan V Oldham, Andy Moulsdale V Gateshead Thunder & Billy Sheen V Gateshead Thunder
Oldest player: Christiaan Roets 31 years, 11 months, 28 days - V Whitehaven 2/9/2012
Youngest player: Lewys Weaver 18 years, 10 months, 29 days - V London Skolars 12/8/2012

Awards, honours and nominations

End-of-season awards

Awards are presented at the end of season dinner.

Nominations for 'Try of the year' were on the Official website after the final game.

Nominations for 'Smash of the year' were on the Official website after the final game.

Voted for by coaching staff.

Voted for on the official website

Voted for by the playing staff

Voted for by members of the Crusaders Rugby League Supporters Club.

Internationals

Players who have won international caps whilst playing for the Crusaders. Stats also include total caps during their career.

Updated 22 October 2012.

References

Statistics and records